Dr. Branko Švarc (1894–1972) was Croatian judge and Mayor of Koprivnica.

Švarc was born in Koprivnica to a Croatian Jewish family. His father was suits trader. Švarc was educated in Prague and Zagreb. He was an active member of the "Academics Club" and later a member of the numerous societies in Koprivnica. Švarc was married to Marija (née Brozović) Švarc, sister of a notable veterinary historian Leander Brozović. In 1932 he was elected as a Mayor of Koprivnica, position which he held until 1937. During World War II Švarc joined the Partisans. In Varaždin Švarc held the position of a judge. Švarc died in 1972 and is buried in a Jewish part of Koprivnica cemetery.

References

Bibliography

 

1894 births
1972 deaths
Croatian Jews
Austro-Hungarian Jews
Croatian Austro-Hungarians
Croatian judges
Jewish Croatian politicians
Mayors of Koprivnica
Yugoslav Partisans members